Qiaozhuang is a town under the administration of Qingchuan County, Sichuan, China. , it administers the following seven residential communities and 18 villages:
Qinxing Community
Fangwei Community
Wanzhong Community
Huilong Community
Chengjiao Community
Huangping Community
Kongxi Community
Zhangjia Village
Shiyuan Village
Dagou Village
Chashu Village
Zaoshu Village
Xinsheng Village
Jiefang Village
Qunfeng Village
Wali Village
Mingjing Village
Wulong Village
Gongjiahe Village
Duiping Village
Sanpan Village
Yaolin Village
Daba Village
Dawu Village
Nanxi Village

In October 2019, Huangping Township, Wali Township, Kongxi Township, and Daba Township were abolished. Qiaozhuang absorbed their administrative areas.

References 

Towns in Sichuan
Qingchuan County